Legislative elections were held in Honduras in October 1926.

Results

References

Elections in Honduras
Honduras
1926 in Honduras
October 1926 events
Election and referendum articles with incomplete results